The 2014 season was Incheon United's tenth season in the K-League in South Korea. Incheon United competed in the K-League and the Korean FA Cup.

Current squad

Out on loan

Transfers

In

Out

Coaching staff

Senior coaching staff

Youth coaching staff

Match results

K League Classic
All times are Korea Standard Time (KST) – UTC+9

League table

Results summary

Results by round

Korean FA Cup

Squad statistics

Appearances
Statistics accurate as of match played 29 August 2014

Goals

Assists

Discipline

References

South Korean football clubs 2014 season
2014